Robert Froissart (born 26 February 1955) is a French former sprinter who competed in the 1980 Summer Olympics.

References

1955 births
Living people
French male sprinters
Olympic athletes of France
Athletes (track and field) at the 1980 Summer Olympics
Athletes (track and field) at the 1979 Mediterranean Games
Mediterranean Games gold medalists for France
Mediterranean Games medalists in athletics
20th-century French people
21st-century French people